Menzi is a Chinese street food made from tapioca starch.

Menzi may also refer to:

South African given name 
Notable people with the name include:

Menzi Dlamini (born 1971), Swazi sprinter
Menzi Masuku (born 1993), South African footballer 
Menzi Ngubane (born 1964), South African actor 
Menzi Simelane (born 1970), South African advocate

See also 
 Menzie, a given name and surname

African given names